Hindustan is a term currently used as an endonym for the modern day Republic of India, and historically used for parts of the subcontinent.

Hindustan or Hindostan may also refer to:

Newspapers 
 Hindustan (newspaper), also known as Dainik Hindustan, a Hindi-language daily newspaper
 Hindustan Times, an Indian English language daily newspaper, with focus on North India

Places 
 Republic of India, a South Asian country
 Hindustan, Indiana, United States, a town south of Martinsville, Indiana
 Hindostan, Indiana

Other uses 
 Hindostan (ship), several ships named Hindostan or Hindustan
 Hindoostan (Battle honour), a battle honour awarded to regiments of the British Army for their service during the conquest of British India between 1780 and 1823

See also 
 
 
 Hindustani (disambiguation)
 Hind (disambiguation)
 Hindi (disambiguation)